The 1982 Australian Drivers' Championship was a CAMS sanctioned Australian motor racing title open to racing cars complying with Australian Formula 1. It was the 26th Australian Drivers' Championship. The title winner, Alfredo Costanzo was awarded the 1982 CAMS "Gold Star".

Schedule
The championship was contested over an eight-round series.

 French Formula One driver Alain Prost (Ralt RT4 Ford) won the Australian Grand Prix though he was ineligible for championship points. Alfredo Costanzo was the highest place domestic competitor (5th) thus earning the maximum championship points for the round.

Points system
Championship points were awarded at each round on a 9-6-4-3-2-1 basis to the first six finishers in round. Points were allotted only to Australian license holders, in their order of finishing, irrespectively of their actual position. The best seven rounds results were counted for each driver. 			
											
Where rounds were conducted over more than one heat, points were allocated on a 20-16-13-11-10-9-8-7-6-5-4-3-2-1 basis for the first 14 places in each heat and then aggregated for each driver to determine the actual round placings. Where more than one driver earned the same number of points the relevant round placing was awarded to the driver who was placed higher in the last heat.

Championship results

Note: At the Australian Grand Prix, fifth placed Alfredo Costanzo was the highest placed driver eligible for the championship and thus was awarded the maximum championship points for the round.

Championship name
The conditions for the 1982 championship were published by CAMS under the name "Australian Formula 1 Championship". Australian Motor Racing Year 1982/83 uses both "Australian Drivers Championship" and "Australian Formula One Championship" in its review of the series. CAMS uses "Australian Drivers' Championship" in its historical records and that has been followed here.

References

External links
 Alf Costanzo (Tiga) leads Alan Jones (Ralt RT4), Winton, 1982 - www.oldracephotos.com

Australian Drivers' Championship
Drivers' Championship